Suphisellus gibbulus is a species of burrowing water beetle in the subfamily Noterinae. It was described by Aubé in 1838 and is found in the United States.

References

Suphisellus
Beetles described in 1838